SS Borinquen, the Taino language name for Puerto Rico, was a passenger liner launched 24 September 1930 and delivered to the Atlantic, Gulf & West Indies Steamship Lines (AGWI) in 1931 for operation by its subsidiary the New York & Porto Rico Line. The line operated the ship until it was requisitioned by the War Shipping Administration (WSA) the last day of 1941 for service  as a troop transport. The line then operated the ship as agent for the WSA until 6 May 1944 when operation was transferred to the United States Army for support of the Normandy landings with the ship arriving off the beaches on 7 June 1944. Borinquen continued service post war until redelivered to the owners 14 June 1946. The ship was sold in 1949 and became the Arosa Star. After further sales and change in the cruise ship regulations the ship was again sold and grounded as La Jenelle on the California coast in 1970.

Construction
Borinquen, designed by Theodore E. Ferris, was laid down at the Bethlehem Shipbuilding Corporation's Fore River Shipyard in Quincy, Massachusetts 20 January 1930, launched 24 September 1930 and completed in 1931 with delivery 20 February 1931. The ship's name comes from the Taino language name, Borikén, for the island of Puerto Rico. Borinquen was delivered to the Atlantic, Gulf & West Indies Steamship Lines (AGWI)  for operation by AGWI's subsidiary, New York & Porto Rico Line. Borinquen was similar in characteristics and design to the line's earlier ship, SS Coamo (1925) with the Lloyd's Register, 1930–31 showing the ship as ordered for the New York & Porto Rico Steamship Company with an original date of 1930, both stricken, with a new date 1931 and "Coamo S.S. Corp" with New York & Porto Rico Steamship Company as manager.

The ship was propelled by single, impulse-reaction type, reduction geared turbines furnished with steam by oil fired tube boilers for about 6,500 horsepower.

Commercial operation
The ship arrived in New York 22 February 1931 and began her working career with a maiden voyage from New York to San Juan, Puerto Rico and Santo Domingo, Dominican Republic which would become her regular scheduled route.

World War II operation
During World War II she was requisitioned from  Agwilines, Inc. by the War Shipping Administration on 31 December 1941 with Agwilines as the operator. On 6 May 1944 Borinquen was transferred to direct War Department operation by the Transportation Corps under bareboat charter as the USAT Borinquen until returned to Agwilines 14 June 1946. She had a capacity for 1,289 troops and 404 medical patients.  USAT Borinquen was one of the Army transports at Normandy.

Beginning on 15 January 1942 the ship's operations centered on the North Atlantic with overseas ports in Iceland and Scotland until 10 May, when she departed Scotland for Freetown and began a period of operation involving African ports. In June she began a voyage from Cape Town to Aden and Suez before returning to West African operations. After a return to New York on 10 August she began operations beginning in November from Belfast and Liverpool involving North Africa and Britain with Oran, Casablanca and Algiers as usual ports before making port in Palermo, Sicily on 31 July 1943. After a return to New York on 22 August 1943 operations were between ports in the United States and Britain until on 5 June she departed Swansea, with the destination being listed as Port en Bessin, France, that was the arrival off Normandy invasion beaches on 7 June 1944. She made one more trip to Belfast, returning to Grandcamp, France, 9 July before beginning a shuttle service largely between Belfast and Liverpool until a return to New York 25 October 1944.  After departure from New York 3 January 1945 she again began a routine shuttle between Southampton and Le Havre until a run to Marseille in August and a return to New York on 31 August 1945.

Sale and subsequent names

On 25 April 1949, she was sold to the Bull Steamship Company and renamed the SS Puerto Rico.

In 1954 she was purchased by the Arosa Line (Compañía Internacional Transportadora – owned by Nicolo Rizzi, a Swiss-Italian financier) and operated as the extensively rebuilt Arosa Star until 1958. As the Arosa Star she was the third largest ship of the Arosa Line, a Swiss cruise line, operating in the mid-1950s. The 2 larger ships in the fleet were the flagship Arosa Sky,  and the older Arosa Sun – originally the French-built liner Felix Roussel. Then came the Arosa Star, with Arosa Kulm bringing up the rear.  The Arosa Star was a ship which traveled several different routes, with many crew on board. At one time Kurt Ebberg was master, Alex Von Blessingh was first officer, Ernest Kuehne was chief engineer, Karl Nahrath was chief purser, and Hasso Wolf was the doctor of the ship.

During at least part of this period, she transported immigrants from northern Europe to Canada and the United States, with regular ports of call at Halifax, Quebec City, Montreal and New York City.  With the advent of affordable air travel, the market for hauling immigrants quickly disappeared and the Arosa Line went bankrupt.

In the years 1959–69, she was operated for Eastern Steamship Lines as the Bahama Star, sailing primarily between Florida and the Bahamas. During this period, the Bahama Star managed to rescue 489 people from the burning SS Yarmouth Castle, another cruise ship; 90 people perished in the blaze. In an ironic twist of fate, this accident led to changes to the maritime regulations pertaining to such ships at the Geneva Convention of 1964, outlawing the operation of passenger vessels with wooden super-structures. The cost of complying with the new regulations proved too expensive, so the ship was sold to the Western Steamship Company.

She was renamed again, this time to La Jenelle. The new owners brought her to Port Hueneme, California, where they intended to sell her. Some say that plans were underway to make her a floating restaurant/casino. Others claim she was to be sold to an Indonesian shipping firm, but neither plan materialized. By 1970, she was anchored outside the harbor to avoid expensive docking fees while efforts were made to find a buyer. On April 13, her luck ran out. That particular day was blustery, with a northwest gale ripping the tops off the waves. Seas broke everywhere, and nearly everyone was in port. La Jenelles starboard anchor – the only one out – began to drag. There were only two crewmen aboard, and they were unable to stop her drift. Only 23 minutes later, she struck the sandy beach west of the Port Hueneme breakwater, her stern just missing the rocks. La Jenelle began to list as she took on water. The crew stayed aboard, attempting to pump her dry so she could be righted, but the seas were pouring in from many smashed portholes and windows making their efforts fruitless. A helicopter arrived to rescue them as the ship settled further into the sand.

The La Jenelle proved to be quite an attraction. Crowds flocked to Silver Strand Beach to see the stranded behemoth. Surfers paddled out to the stricken ship to wander among passageways canted at impossible angles, reminiscent of the film, Poseidon Adventure. Salvers picked over her bones, tearing away loose brass hardware and anything else of value. Her plates began to buckle under the incessant pounding of the surf as one compartment after another was destroyed. A fire, perhaps started by vandals, gutted her interior. La Jenelle became a real hazard in time, for it was impossible to keep people off her. Eventually a souvenir hunter fell from the wreck and was drowned. By then, the owners had faded from the scene during the litigation that follows such an incident. A United States Navy team cut the top off the ship and brought in rocks to fill in the carcass. La Jenelle was transformed into a new arm for the Port of Hueneme breakwater.

Notes

See also 
Arosa Sky alias Bianca C.
Arosa Kulm

References

Bibliography

External links 
 Borinquen
  Porto Rico Line (New York & Porto Rico Steamship Co.)
 The USAT Borinquen and its Voyages
 Arosa Star Promo
 Life on Arosa Star 1957
Los Angeles Times photo archive of shipwreck

1930 ships
Troop ships of the War Shipping Administration
Transport ships of the United States Army
Cruise ships
Maritime incidents in 1970
Maritime incidents in the United States
Shipwrecks of the California coast